Don Marco Alfonso Torlonia, 6th Prince of Civitella-Cesi (2 July 1937 – 5 December 2014) was the son of Alessandro Torlonia, 5th Prince of Civitella-Cesi and his wife, Infanta Beatriz of Spain, daughter of King Alfonso XIII of Spain. He was, therefore, first cousin to King Juan Carlos I of Spain. He was also an uncle to Princess Sibilla of Luxembourg, daughter of his younger sister, Olimpia.

Marriage and issue

He married firstly Donna Orsetta Caracciolo, dei Duchi di Melito dei Principi di Castagneto (17 May 1940 – 10 March 1968) on 16 September 1960 (marriage dissolved by her death in 1968). They have one son and two grandchildren:
Giovanni Torlonia, 7th Prince of Civitella-Cesi (18 April 1962), who married  Carla DeStefanis on 9 June 2001, with issue:
Prince Stanislao of Civitella-Cesi (January 2005)
Princess Olimpia of Civitella-Cesi (2008)

He married secondly Philippa McDonald on 9 November 1968 (marriage dissolved by divorce in 1975). They have one daughter:
Princess Vittoria Eugenia Carolina Honor Paola Alexandra Maria Torlonia (8 May 1971) she married Kenneth Lindsay on 20 December 1997 and they were divorced. They have two children. She remarried to Stefano Colonna and they have one daughter. 
Josephine Lindsay (1998)	 	 	 	 	 	 
Benedict Lindsay (2001) 
Francesca Colonna (2008)
	
He married thirdly Blažena Svitáková on 11 November 1985. They have one daughter and two grandsons:
Princess Catarina Agnese Torlonia (14 June 1974), who married Stefano d’Albora on 28 July 2000, with issue:
Gianpaolo d'Albora (2002)
Gianmarco d'Albora (2003)

Ancestry

References

1937 births
2014 deaths
Marco
Marco
Nobility from Rome